Equitorial Trust Bank Plc. (ETB), commonly referred to as Equitorial Bank, was a commercial bank in Nigeria. It was one of the twenty-six (26) commercial banks licensed by the Central Bank of Nigeria (CBN), the country's banking regulator, in early 2011 before a merger with Sterling Bank.

Overview
ETB is a large financial services provider in Nigeria. , the bank maintained about one hundred (100) retail branches in various urban centers in the country.

History
The bank was established in January 1990, as a limited liability company. In February the same year, it was granted a commercial banking license and in March 1990, it commenced banking operations. In 2006, ETB successfully merged with the former Devcom Bank. The bank is a national bank, which has most of its retail outlets located in Nigeria's major urban centers.

In 2009, in an audit by the Central Bank of Nigeria, ETB was found to be under-capitalized and unsatisfactorily managed. Subsequent to those discoveries, CBN directed ETB to reduce company staff numbers to maintain profitability. 150 staff members, representing about 15% of the bank's work force were fired in March 2010. ETB was also added to a list of nine (9) Nigerian commercial banks that required the injection of new capital by the Asset Management Company of Nigeria (AMCON), a federal government agency.
ETB was taken over by Sterling bank in a deal that was sealed on 11 August 2011.

Ownership
Prior to 2009, the shares of stock of the bank were privately owned. However, due to the intervention of the CBN and AMCON in 2009, a significant percentage of shareholding in ETB is owned by the Federal Government of Nigeria.

External links
 Website of Equatorial Trust Bank
 Website of Central Bank of Nigeria

See also
 List of banks in Nigeria
 Central Bank of Nigeria
 Economy of Nigeria

References

Defunct banks of Nigeria
Companies based in Lagos
Banks established in 1990
Victoria Island, Lagos
1990 establishments in Nigeria